Michael A. Bender is an American computer scientist, known for his work in cache-oblivious algorithms, lowest common ancestor data structures, scheduling (computing), and pebble games. He is David R. Smith Leading Scholar professor of computer science at Stony Brook University, and a co-founder of storage technology startup company Tokutek.

Early life and education 
Bender obtained his PhD in computer science in 1998 from the Harvard University under the supervision of Michael O. Rabin.

Research contributions 
After completing his Ph.D., he co-founded Tokutek. He was program chair of the 19th ACM Symposium on Parallelism in Algorithms and Architectures (SPAA 2006). The cache-oblivious B-tree data structures studied by Bender, Demaine, and Farach-Colton beginning in 2000 became the basis for the fractal tree index used by Tokutek's products TokuDB and TokuMX.

Awards and honors
In 2012 Bender won the Simon Imre Test of Time award at LATIN.  In 2015, his paper "Two-Level Main Memory Co-Design: Multi-Threaded Algorithmic Primitives, Analysis, and Simulation" won the Best Paper award at IPDPS.
In 2016, his paper "Optimizing Every Operation in a Write-optimized File System" won the Best Paper award at FAST.

Selected publications
.
. Previously announced at FOCS 2000.
. 
.

References

External links
Home page
Google scholar profile

Year of birth missing (living people)
Living people
American computer scientists
Theoretical computer scientists
Harvard University alumni
Stony Brook University faculty
ENS Fontenay-Saint-Cloud-Lyon alumni